The Princess and the Frog (Original Motion Picture Soundtrack) is the soundtrack of the 2009 Disney animated film The Princess and the Frog. It was released by Walt Disney Records on November 23, 2009, just a day before the limited release of the film in New York City and Los Angeles. It contains ten original songs and seven score pieces, all but one of which were composed, arranged and conducted by composer Randy Newman, who previously worked with the film's executive producer John Lasseter on Pixar's films Toy Story, A Bug's Life, Toy Story 2, Monsters, Inc. and Cars. "Never Knew I Needed" was written and performed by Ne-Yo. The song had an accompanying music video which featured rotation on Disney Channel. The song was also sent to rhythmic radio on October 27, 2009. The songs are performed by various artists most of which lend their voices to characters in the film. The score features African-American-influenced styles including jazz, zydeco, blues and gospel.

"Almost There" and "Down in New Orleans" were both nominated in the Best Original Song category at the 82nd Academy Awards; they lost to "The Weary Kind". "Down in New Orleans" was also nominated for the Grammy Award for Best Song Written for a Motion Picture, Television or Other Visual Media at the 2011 Grammy Awards.

Track listing

Charts

Reception

In 2010, Rhapsody called it one of the all-time great Disney and Pixar soundtracks.

References

External links
 Disney Records website

2009 soundtrack albums
Disney animation soundtracks
Walt Disney Records soundtracks
The Princess and the Frog
Randy Newman soundtracks
Jazz soundtracks
Blues soundtracks
Soul soundtracks
Rhythm and blues soundtracks